Children in Need 2004 was a campaign held in the United Kingdom to raise money for the charity Children in Need. It culminated in a live broadcast on BBC One on the evening of Friday 19 November and was hosted primarily by Terry Wogan, who was assisted by Gaby Roslin. The voice over was Alan Dedicoat.

Television campaign

Artist performances 
Girls Aloud
Blue
Bryan Adams
Geri Halliwell
Kylie Minogue
Shania Twain
Travis
Jamie Cullum
Daniel Bedingfield
Snow Patrol
Paul Weller
Katie Melua
McFly
Natasha Bedingfield
Rolf Harris
Amanda Holden
Westlife

Cast performances 
 BBC Newsreaders pretending to be Duran Duran and Bananarama
 Members of the Mary Poppins stage musical.
 The cast of Coronation Street perform their version of the musical Oliver!.
 The cast of Bad Girls perform  their version of musical Chicago's "Cell Block Tango"
 Cast of Mamma Mia

Others 
 Magician Scott Penrose performed an "all star" magic act, aided by a number of celebrity assistants. Actress Debra Stephenson was levitated and made to disappear, Katie Melua was divided into three in the Zig Zag Girl, Amanda Holden was beheaded by a guillotine, and singer Shania Twain was sawed in half in an illusion called Clearly Impossible.

Official single 
The official single for 2004's appeal was recorded by Girls Aloud. The band recorded a cover of The Pretenders' 1994 song I'll Stand By You for the charity. The single reached number one on the UK Singles Chart for two weeks.

Totals

See also

References 

2004 in the United Kingdom
2004 in British television
2004
November 2004 events in the United Kingdom